The Book Tower is a British television series for children, produced by Yorkshire Television,  that ran for 11 series from 3 January 1979 to 16 May 1989.

Initially presented by Doctor Who star Tom Baker (1979–81), each episode explored one or more books, using dramatic presentations, with the aim of getting children interested in reading.

Later presenters included Stephen Moore (1982–83), Alun Armstrong (1984), Neil Innes (1985), Roger McGough (1986), and Bernard Bresslaw (1987). In 1988, each episode featured a different presenter, including Victoria Wood, Nick Wilton, Margi Clarke, Wincey Willis, and Timmy Mallett.

The theme tune, based on Paganini's 24th Caprice, was taken from Andrew Lloyd Webber's album Variations.

The opening sequence of the original TV series showed images of Sudbury Hall in Derbyshire.

Since its original screening, the show has not been released on VHS, DVD or any form of streaming media.

Episode list

References

British Television Children's Research Guide

External links

Television series by Yorkshire Television
1979 British television series debuts
1989 British television series endings
1970s British children's television series
1980s British children's television series
ITV children's television shows
Television series by ITV Studios
British children's fantasy television series
BAFTA winners (television series)